Edward Dillon (1739–1809) was an Irish clergyman who served as a Roman Catholic prelate in Ireland during the late 18th and early 19th centuries.

Dillon was born at Caltra, Ballinasloe, County Galway. He was educated in France, becoming Superior of Irish College, Douai. Towards the end of 1791 the civil oath was demanded of the clergy. On 18 December 1791 Dillon presented a petition to the local revolutionary committee acknowledging French generosity but denying charges of partiality towards the royalist faction. This resulted in the exemption from the oath been granted to the Irish college.

War between France and the Great Britain in 1793 brought an end to the immunity and the closure of the college. Dillon returned to Ireland and appointed coadjutor bishop of the diocese of Kilmacduagh and Kilfenora on 21 January 1794, and the following year succeeded as the diocesan Bishop of Kilmacduagh and Kilfenora on 29 June 1795. He subsequently became Archbishop of Tuam on 19 November 1798. He was unpopular with both his flock and the ruling class; the former for his denouncements of the United Irishmen and the French revolution. He died in office on 13 or 30 August 1809.

References
 Biographical Dictionary of Irishmen in France, Richard Hayes, Dublin, 1949.
 Archbishop Edward Dillon. Catholic Hierarchy website.

1739 births
1809 deaths
Roman Catholic archbishops of Tuam
Bishops of Kilmacduagh and Kilfenora
People from County Galway
19th-century Roman Catholic archbishops in Ireland
Irish expatriates in France
18th-century Roman Catholic archbishops in Ireland